Manuel González Etura (born 21 February 1934) is a Spanish retired footballer who played as a defender.

Football career
Born in Sestao, Biscay, Etura spent 13 seasons in La Liga with Athletic Bilbao after signing in summer 1953 from neighbouring CD Getxo. He only played 16 games in his first three years combined, his debut coming on 12 December 1954 in a 3–0 home win against Hércules CF.

During his stint at the San Mamés Stadium, Etura appeared in 248 matches across all competitions, scoring three goals. His first in the league came on 27 September 1959, but in a 2–3 away loss to Granada CF.

Etura won four titles with his main club, included the 1955–56 national championship to which he contributed with nine appearances. He retired in 1967 at the age of 34, after a spell in Segunda División with SD Indautxu.

Honours
Athletic Bilbao
La Liga: 1955–56
Copa del Generalísimo: 1955, 1956, 1958

References

External links

1934 births
Living people
People from Sestao
Sportspeople from Biscay
Spanish footballers
Footballers from the Basque Country (autonomous community)
Association football defenders
La Liga players
Segunda División players
CD Getxo players
Athletic Bilbao footballers
SD Indautxu footballers
Spain B international footballers